The Governor's Cup Stakes is an American harness racing event run annually for two-year-old standardbred pacers at a distance of one mile. First run in 1985 as a fixed event at Garden State Park, that track closed on May 3, 2001 and the Governor's Cup would then be run at various race venues in the U.S. Northeast and in Ontario, Canada. Since 2013 the race has been part of the 'Fall Four' stakes and has been alternated between Meadowlands Racetrack in East Rutherford, New Jersey and  Woodbine Racetrack in Toronto, Ontario.

Historical race events
In a 2011 Hambletonian Society, Inc. article on trainer Ray Schnittker, in referring to the 2009 Governor's Cup winner One More Laugh, author Jay Bergman wrote: "His [One More Laugh] victory in the Governor’s Cup at Harrah's Chester at two may go down as the greatest single effort by a two-year-old in the sports history."

At Woodbine Racetrack, 2010 winner Big Jim, a $35,000 yearling purchase who would go on to career earnings of $1,541,924, set a then world record time of 1:49 1/5 for two-year-old pacers. Through 2015 his time is still the Governor's Cup stakes record.

Locations
Garden State Park Racetrack (GSP) (1985-2000)
Meadowlands Racetrack (Mmx) (2001, 2002, 2004, 2006, 2013, 2015)
Mohawk Raceway (Moh) (2003)
Woodbine Racetrack (Wdb) (2005, 2007, 2008, 2010, 2014, 2016)
Harrah's Chester Racetrack (Chst) (2009, 2011)

Records
 Most wins by a driver
 6 – John Campbell (1989, 1990, 1992, 1993, 2001, 2002)

 Most wins by a trainer
 8 – Robert McIntosh (1995, 1998, 2001, 2008)

 Stakes record
1:49 1/5 – Big Jim (2010) (Wdb)
1:50 0/0 – Western Shooter (2001) (Mmx)
1:52 1/5 – Western Hanover (1991) (GSP)

Winners of the Governor's Cup Stakes

External links
YouTube video of Big Jim winning the 2010 Governor's Cup in World Record time

References

Harness racing in Canada
Harness racing in the United States
Recurring sporting events established in 1985
Sport in Toronto
Sports in East Rutherford, New Jersey
1985 establishments in New Jersey